Alsan may refer to:

People
 Alsan Sanda (born 1992), Indonesian football player
 Gökhan Alsan (born 1990), Turkish football player
 Marcella Alsan (born 1977), American Physician/Economist

Places
 Alsan, also known as Alzano Scrivia, Italy